Thandiwe Helen Phoenix (born 5 September 1993), better known by her stage name Thandi Phoenix, is an Australian singer-songwriter from Newtown in Inner Sydney. Thandi is half South African.

Career
Thandi Phoenix has performed at festivals such as Spilt Milk, Splendour in the Grass, Byron Bay Bluesfest and Womadelaide. She has supported Rudimental, Vera Blue, Jhene Aiko, Tinashe, and Tinie Tempah on their national tours. In March 2019, Thandi performed on Triple J's Like a Version and in October 2019, she released her self-titled debut EP.

Discography

Extended plays

Singles

As featured artist

References 

Singers from Sydney
Living people
21st-century Australian singers
Australian musicians
Australian women pop singers
21st-century Australian women singers
1993 births
Australian people of South African descent